is a Japanese animator and illustrator from Kyoto Prefecture, who used to work for the anime studio Kyoto Animation. When illustrating a light novel, she uses the pen name . She is best known as being the character designer for the anime adaptations of Lucky Star and K-On!, the anime original Tamako Market and for being the illustrator of the light novel Kokoro Connect.

She is the older sister of BUNBUN (also known as abec), also a light novel illustrator, responsible for the illustration of the light novel Sword Art Online, Sword Art Online: Progressive, original character designer on the anime Sakura Quest, and many more works. She is very close to her younger brother and was once part of a doujinshi circle with him.

Career
After graduating from junior college, Horiguchi joined Kyoto Animation in 2003. Her first position was as an animator for the television anime Crayon Shin-chan, and began work as a key animator for the first time on Episode 163 of Inuyasha. Her first work as a character designer was for Lucky☆Star. She has also worked on anime such as K-ON! and Tamako Market. In 2007, she illustrated her first light novel, and since then, she continued to do it for many works on the market.

Horiguchi's last credited work at Kyoto Animation was as the character designer and animation director on Tamako Market in 2013. Since then she decided to become a freelancer and work on different projects of anime and mainly as an illustrator of light novels.

Works

Anime
Lucky Star (2007) - character design, chief animation director
K-On! (2009) - character design, chief animation director
Tamako Market (2013) - character design, chief animation director
Ano Hi no Kanojo-tachi (2018) - character design, animation director, original character designer for Miu Takigawa
Hello World (2019) - character design

Light novel illustrations
Lucky Star Yuruyuru Days
Hayate no Gotoku! Nagi ga Tsukaima!? Yattoke Sekai Seifuku
Tobira no Soto
Zarathustra e no Kaidan
Ryokuma no Machi
Kokoro Connect (2010-2013)
Akaoni wa Mō Nakanai
Buta wa Tondemo Tada no Buta?
Tamako Market
Aoi Haruno Subete (2014)
Demons' Crest (2022)

Others
22/7 (character design, original character designer for Miu Takigawa)
Vocaloid 4 library Tone Rion V4 & Yumemi Nemu (character design)
Sakura Wars (2019) (guest character design)

References

External links
 Yukiko Horiguchi's personal website 
 

1983 births
Anime character designers
Japanese animators
Living people
Japanese women animators
Japanese women illustrators
Kyoto Animation people